Baddrol bin Bakhtiar (born 1 February 1988) is a Malaysian professional footballer who plays for Malaysia Super League club Sabah FC and former squad of Malaysia national team.

Baddrol is usually employed in the right side of the midfield role, although he has often been deployed as a left-sided midfielder. He is also a former member of Malaysia U-23 and Malaysia U-20 squad. He is regarded as the best player in right position in Malaysia.

He spend most of his club career with Kedah Darul Aman (formerly known as Kedah FA) starting from 2005 until end of 2021, before signing for Sabah FC in 1 December 2021 as a free transfer.

Club career

Kedah
Baddrol began his football career with the Kedah youth team. He also was part of the Kedah's 2006 Sukma Games team which won the silver medalist. He became the regular during the tournament. His performances during Sukma Games have attracted the interest of Kedah Football Association management. Baddrol signed his first professional contract with Kedah in 2005/06 season and has made his debut in the 2006 Malaysia Cup away match against Penang. Baddrol has established himself in Kedah's first team competed for his spot along with K. Soley as right winger and Khyril Muhymeen on the left side.

Nevertheless, after K. Soley left Kedah to join their local rivals, Perlis, Baddrol proved himself as one of the best young talents of the Kedah's youth system. Starting from the 2007-08 season, Baddrol became a first-team regular for Azraai Khor's squad and performed well in each match with his ability to terrorize defenders and his pace and trickery with the ball. 

Baddrol have played more than 300 matches and scored 123 goals in all competitions for Kedah, the records made him as the club all-time top scorer.

Trials
On 6 April 2008, Gifted Group chairman Jonathan Price fulfilled his promise to let Baddrol and his former Kedah teammate Mohd Bunyamin Umar train for two weeks with Chelsea FC at Stamford Bridge alongside their youngsters and their more senior players such as Shaun Wright-Phillips, Tal Ben Haim, Steve Sidwell and Nicolas Anelka.

In August 2011, rumors circulated that the English Premier League club, Wigan Athletic FC has offered Baddrol a trial, but this was neither denied nor confirmed by Wigan officials. The rumor would later eventually be dismissed as false.

Sabah FC
After playing his trade with Kedah for almost 16 years, Baddrol signed for Sabah on a free transfer at the age of 33. He made his home debut on 4th April 2022 against Negeri Sembilan.

In 10th April 2022, he scored his first goal against Sarawak United of the 2022 Super League game at the Sarawak State Stadium, Sarawak.

International career
Baddrol, alongside his teammates Abdul Hadi Abdul Hamid, Mohd Sabre Mat Abu and Mohd Khyril Muhymeen Zambri, Muhammad Shafiq Jamal and Mohd Bunyamin Umar earned their first call-up in 2005 to the Malaysia U-20. He made his youth international match debut in AFC Youth Championship 2006 qualifying round on 12 December 2005 against Myanmar at Kuala Lumpur as Malaysia beat Myanmar 4–2. After qualifying to the final round in Bangalore, Baddrol however scored an own goal and Malaysia went down to Vietnam 1–2 in their opening match on 30 October 2006.

Baddrol was also a part of Malaysia U-19 squad for the 2007 Champions Youth Cup. His action in a match against Chelsea wooed the Chelsea coaching staff who gave him a chance to train at Stamford Bridge.

He made his full international debut against Kenya on 12 August 2009. He scored his first goal for the senior team in the match against Uzbekistan on 18 November 2009. He also part of the 2009 Southeast Asian Games winning squad and managed to score a total 3 goals, 1 against Timor Leste U-23 and 2 goals in the semi final against Laos U-23

Baddrol captained the Malaysia U-23 team and led them into winning the gold medal at the 2011 Southeast Asian Games. He also scored three goals and scored the last kick of penalty shoot out against Indonesia U-23 to contribute to the second consecutive triumph. In 2018 Asian Games, he was selected as one of the overage players for the Malaysia U-23 team. He captained the team throughout the tournament and create an upset in a 2-1 win over South Korea U-23.

Career statistics

Club

International

International goals
Scores and results list Malaysia's goal tally first.

U23 International goals

Personal life
Baddrol was born in Sarawak and currently living in Ambangan Heights, Sungai Petani, Kedah. Baddrol's parents are from Negeri Sembilan, his father being a soldier in the Angkatan Tentera Malaysia (ATM).

Honours
Kedah FA
 Malaysia Super League (2): 2006–2007, 2007–2008
 FA Cup Malaysia (4): 2007, 2008, 2017, 2019
 Malaysia Cup (3): 2007, 2008, 2016
 Malaysia Premier League (2): 2005–06, 2015
 Malaysia Charity Shield: 2017

International
 Southeast Asian Games (2): 2009, 2011
 2014 AFF Suzuki Cup: Runner Up

Individual
 PFAM Player of the Month: August 2016,  February 2017, June 2019
 FAM Football Awards Best Midfielder Award: 2010, 2017, 2021
 FAM Football Awards Most Valuable Players Award: 2017
 FAM Football Awards Local Top Scores: 2021

References

External links
 
 
 Biodata Baddrol Bakhtiar 
 

1988 births
Living people
Malaysian footballers
Malaysia international footballers
Kedah Darul Aman F.C. players
Sabah F.C. (Malaysia) players
People from Kedah
Malaysian people of Indonesian descent
Malaysia Super League players
Association football midfielders
Southeast Asian Games gold medalists for Malaysia
Southeast Asian Games medalists in football
Footballers at the 2018 Asian Games
Competitors at the 2011 Southeast Asian Games
Asian Games competitors for Malaysia